|}

This is a list of House of Assembly results for the 1982 South Australian state election.

Results by electoral district

Adelaide

Albert Park

Alexandra

Ascot Park

Baudin

Bragg

Brighton

Chaffey

Coles

Davenport

Elizabeth

Eyre

Fisher

Flinders

Florey

Gilles

Glenelg

Goyder

Hanson

Hartley

Henley Beach

Kavel

Light

Mallee 

The two candidate preferred vote was not counted between the Liberal and National candidates for Mallee.

Mawson

Mitcham

Mitchell

Morphett

Mount Gambier

Murray

Napier

Newland

Norwood

Peake

Playford

Price

Rocky River

Ross Smith

Salisbury

Semaphore

Spence

Stuart

Todd

Torrens

Unley

Victoria

Whyalla

See also
 Candidates of the 1982 South Australian state election
 Members of the South Australian House of Assembly, 1982–1985

References

1982
1982 elections in Australia
1980s in South Australia